Fires at Midnight is the third studio album by the group Blackmore's Night, released July 10, 2001 through SPV/Steamhammer. In comparison to their previous two releases, there are more electric guitar parts on this album, whilst maintaining a folk rock direction. The album was a Top Ten record in Germany.

On December 2001, Fires At Midnight was a finalist on the New Age Voice award for the best vocal album of the year. In 2004 the album went Gold in the Czech Republic.

The album was one of the 10 international bestsellers in Russia during the Autumn of 2001. The single "Times They Are A Changin" stayed in the Russian top 20 Hits for over 9 weeks.

It featured the singles "The Times They Are a Changin'", "Home Again" and "All Because of You".

Track listing

Bonus tracks

Personnel
 Ritchie Blackmore – electric and acoustic guitars, hurdy-gurdy, mandolin, renaissance drums, tambourine
 Candice Night – lead and backing vocals, pennywhistle, shawms, harp, recorder, electronic bagpipes
 Sir Robert of Normandie (Robert Curiano) – bass, backing vocals
 Carmine Giglio – keyboards
 Chris Devine – violin, viola, recorders, flute
 Mike Sorrentino – drums
 Richard Wiederman – trumpets
 John Passanante – trombone
 Pat Regan – keyboards
 Albert Dannemann – bagpipes on "All Because of You"

Charts

References

2001 albums
Blackmore's Night albums
SPV/Steamhammer albums